Sergio "Sergi" Moreno Marín (born 25 November 1987) is an Andorran footballer. He currently plays for Inter Club d'Escaldes.

International goal 
Scores and results list Andorra's goal tally first.

References

1987 births
Living people
People from Escaldes-Engordany
Andorran footballers
Andorran expatriate sportspeople in Spain
Andorran expatriate sportspeople in Italy
Andorran expatriate sportspeople in Albania
Andorran expatriate sportspeople in Malta
Association football midfielders
Getafe CF B players
FC Andorra players
UE Lleida players
KF Vllaznia Shkodër players
Gżira United F.C. players
Tercera División players
Andorra international footballers
Andorran expatriate footballers
Expatriate footballers in Spain
Expatriate footballers in Italy
Expatriate footballers in Albania
Expatriate footballers in Malta
Yeclano Deportivo players
FC Jumilla players
Inter Club d'Escaldes players
CF Gimnástico Alcázar players